Tobias Williams (born November 19, 1959) is a former American football defensive lineman in the National Football League (NFL). He was drafted by the New York Jets in the 10th round of the 1983 NFL Draft. He played six seasons, as a defensive end and defensive tackle, all with the Patriots.

The 1987 season was interrupted by a labor dispute.  Soon after the strike began, the Patriots coaching staff accused Williams of throwing a beer bottle at replacement players during a confrontation at a union picket line. Williams missed training camp the next summer; the Patriots retained his rights but they gave him permission to negotiate with other teams. He signed with the Patriots just before the season began. He retired from professional football after that 1988 season.

Since the mid-1990s, he has been an assistant coach at several high schools in suburban Boston, as well as at Bridgewater State College, Dean College and the University at Buffalo.

He played college football at Nebraska.  His daughter Candace Williams was a star college basketball player with the University of New Hampshire Wildcats through the 2009-10 season.

References

External links
New England Patriots bio

1959 births
Living people
American football defensive tackles
American football defensive ends
Nebraska Cornhuskers football players
New England Patriots players
Buffalo Bulls football coaches